Sutirtha Mukherjee is an Indian table-tennis player from West Bengal. She has won national Table Tennis Championship and also was just a part of Gold medal winning Indian women's team at 2018 Commonwealth Games.

She had qualified to represent India at the 2020 Summer Olympics.

In the 2018 Commonwealth Games, Mukherjee was the part of Gold medal winning Indian women's team.

Controversy 
In 2021, fellow compatriot, Manika Batra accused Indian National Coach Soumyadeep Roy of pressuring her to throw a match at the Olympic Qualifiers (in March) to Sutirtha to allow Sutirtha to qualify. Manika Batra would have already qualified because of her higher ranking. A committee composed of two former Supreme Court judges found that Roy had indeed tried to manipulate the match but found no evidence of Batra throwing the match away in an eventual loss to Mukherjee.

See also 

 India at the 2020 Summer Olympics

References

1995 births
Living people
Indian female table tennis players
Table tennis players at the 2018 Commonwealth Games
People from Kolkata
Table tennis players at the 2020 Summer Olympics
Olympic table tennis players of India
Commonwealth Games medallists in table tennis
Commonwealth Games gold medallists for India
Table tennis players at the 2018 Asian Games
Asian Games competitors for India
Medallists at the 2018 Commonwealth Games
South Asian Games gold medalists for India
South Asian Games silver medalists for India
South Asian Games medalists in table tennis